Allan Zeman GBM, GBS, JP (Chinese name: 盛智文; born 18 July 1949) is a Hong Kong business magnate.

Background and personal life
Allan Zeman was born into a Jewish family in Regensburg, Germany; and was raised in Montreal, Quebec, Canada, where his mother worked in a hospital. When Zeman was seven years old, his father died. He started working at the age of ten. He dropped out of college, and by the age of nineteen, while working for a lingerie company, he had earned his first US$1 million.

He made his first fortune by importing clothes from Hong Kong. He frequently travelled to Hong Kong for work in the 1970s, and eventually moved there in 1975. Zeman is married to Charmaine Zeman; they have two children: Jonathan Zeman and Marisa Zeman-McConnell. He speaks English, French and some Cantonese, and is a teetotaler.

Career

In 1975, Zeman founded Colby International Group to source clothing in China and export it to Canada. In late 2000, by now a much larger and diversified company, Colby was sold to Li & Fung Ltd., a major competitor. In the early 1980s, Zeman felt that Hong Kong had no western restaurant that suited his needs, so in 1983 he opened California Restaurant in Lan Kwai Fong, a narrow street in Central, Hong Kong. He bought the entire block in 1984 and thus launched his career as both an entertainment operator and property developer.  In 2000 Zeman sold Colby International for $280 million to Li & Feng.

Through Lan Kwai Fong Holdings Ltd, of which he is chairman, he drove the development of Lan Kwai Fong to be one of the most important bar and night life districts in Hong Kong. He is said to own 65 percent of the district's properties.

Meanwhile, as chairman of Lan Kwai Fong Concepts Holdings Ltd., he controls a number of restaurants in Lan Kwai Fong including California, California Coffee, China Lan Kwai Fong, Indochine, Tokio Joe, Cafe des Artistes, Tutta Luna, Jazz Club, Thai Lemongrass, BACI, BACI Pizza and Luna Di Notte.

In July 2003, Zeman was appointed by the then-Chief Executive of Hong Kong, Tung Chee-hwa, to become the chairman of Ocean Park. He managed to raise visitor numbers despite the opening of rival Hong Kong Disneyland. By 2007, Forbes magazine dubbed him “Hong Kong's Mouse Killer”. By 2014, Zeman stepped down from the chairmanship.

Honours
In 2001, he was appointed a Justice of the Peace in Hong Kong, in 2004, he was awarded the Gold Bauhinia Star and in 2011 he was awarded the Grand Bauhinia Medal.

Other business interests

Film and TV
A noted film producer, Zeman is chairman of Sweetpea Entertainment Inc., a film production company based in Los Angeles. He is also involved with After Dark Films, a movie company.

Fashion
As well as having built and sold off the successful Colby group, Zeman is a director of Algo Group, another fashion business. In February 2007, he was named "Stylemaker of the Year" by Style Magazine (published by the South China Morning Post).

Property development
Zeman is a property developer and built the Andara Resort and Villas in Phuket, Thailand. In 2020 Zeman was working with Richard Li on a villa and golf course development in Phang Nga.

Other
Zeman is chairman of Mesco Shipyard Ltd (shipbuilding) and DKA Ltd (public relations), and a director of Wynn Resorts. He is a non-executive director of Pacific Century Premium Developments Ltd.

Political activity
He supported Regina Ip, the former Secretary for Security in the 2007 Legco by-election in the Hong Kong Island constituency. However, she was defeated by Anson Chan.

In 2017, he gave his support to Carrie Lam, who announced on 12 January 2017 that she would run for the Chief Executive role in Hong Kong, which position she gained in March 2017.  By mid-2019 he was being cited as an economic adviser to Lam in her Chief Executive role.

In 2019, he supported an independent inquiry into how police clashed with protestors, but has since flipped his position on the inquiry and said the city had moved on. During his 2021 election campaign, his platform supported the safeguarding of national security. Additionally, he commented on universal suffrage, claiming that "I'm not saying never universal suffrage, but if you bring it in too early, it creates divisions."

Zeman ran in the Election Committee constituency of the 2021 Hong Kong legislative election but was not elected.

In October 2022, after several US lawmakers warned US financial executives to not attend the Global Financial Leaders' Investment Summit, Zeman said that "Hong Kong is nothing like what they talked about" and "It just shows how uninformed they are." Zeman also said that Paul Chan, who tested positive for COVID-19 before the Summit, should be granted an exemption by the government to allow him to escape restrictions and attend the Summit, saying "That's the whole point of the financial conference, which is really to show to the world that the city is really opening up."

In November 2022, Zeman said that there was no point to push for dropping of all COVID-19 restrictions, and said that "There is no point in continuing to talk about '0+0'. It’s more important to have targeted measures to make people's lives better." A month later in December 2022, Zeman said that COVID-19 restrictions should be loosened, "I'm hoping that the government will really understand now that China has changed, it's time for Hong Kong to follow. Because the Chinese government is now sending a message to all citizens that Covid-19 is not so serious now." On 22 December 2022, after some restrictions were dropped, Zeman said it was "best Christmas present for everybody."

In February 2023, after tensions rose between the US consul general and the government, Zeman said "This US consul has made some bold statements, forcing the Chinese government to respond and protect itself."

Official positions
Zeman is prominent in government circles, sitting on various committees, boards and advisory bodies. He is a long-standing member of the Board of Governors of the Canadian Chamber of Commerce and the Hong Kong General Chamber of Commerce. He is a member of the Economic and Employment Council in Hong Kong. He is a board member of the Tourism Strategy Group for the Hong Kong Tourism Commission, the Cultural and Heritage Commission and the Urban Renewal Authority.  He is a member of the International Events Fund Steering Committee for the Hong Kong Tourism Board. He was appointed as a member of the Services Promotion Strategy Group, chaired by the Financial Secretary. He is on the Board of the Hong Kong Arts Festival and Hong Kong Community Chest.

Citizenship
Zeman has long held the right of abode in Hong Kong; this entitled him to a Hong Kong permanent identity card. In addition, in September 2008, Zeman renounced his Canadian citizenship and became a naturalised citizen of the People's Republic of China, as he said he has lived and worked in Hong Kong for 38 years and has always considered it to be his home. The Chinese citizenship, combined with his right of abode in Hong Kong, enables him to hold a Home Return Permit for entering mainland China, and a Hong Kong Special Administrative Region passport for international travel.

References

External links
Serving with Passion: Lan Kwai Fong A South China Morning Post vidcast featuring an interview with Allan Zeman, dated 29 May 2007, where he tells the creation story of Hong Kong's famous entertainment district
Ying Ying and Le Le come to Hong Kong A South China Morning Post vidcast showing the arrival of Hong Kong's new pandas. Ocean Park chairman Allan Zeman explains their significance. Dated 28 April 2007.
Hong Kong shows its style A South China Morning Post vidcast, dated 20 January 1997, showed Allan Zeman's reaction at being named "Stylemaker of the Year".
Official website of Lan Kwai Fong Group

1949 births
Businesspeople from Montreal
Canadian chief executives
Canadian emigrants to Hong Kong
Canadian real estate businesspeople
Hong Kong textiles industry businesspeople
German chief executives
20th-century German Jews
German emigrants to Canada
Hong Kong chief executives
Hong Kong fashion businesspeople
Hong Kong real estate businesspeople
Living people
Naturalised citizens of the People's Republic of China in Hong Kong
Naturalized citizens of Canada
People from Regensburg
Recipients of the Grand Bauhinia Medal
Members of the Election Committee of Hong Kong, 2007–2012
Members of the Election Committee of Hong Kong, 2012–2017
Members of the Election Committee of Hong Kong, 2017–2021
Members of the Election Committee of Hong Kong, 2021–2026
New People's Party (Hong Kong) politicians